Statistics of Latvian Higher League in the 1948 season.

Overview
It was contested by 12 teams, and PAK Zhmylov won the championship.

League standings

References
RSSSF

Latvian SSR Higher League
Football 
Latvia